Tenteling is a commune in the Moselle department in Grand Est in north-eastern France.
Tenteling consists of the villages Tenteling and Ebring.

See also
 Communes of the Moselle department

References

External links
 

Communes of Moselle (department)